Ang Tshering Sherpa may refer to:

 Ang Tshering Sherpa (entrepreneur) (1964–2019), Nepali entrepreneur
 Ang Tshering Sherpa (mountaineer) (born 1953), Nepali mountaineer